Stuart Robson (born Henry Robson Stuart, March 4, 1836 – April 29, 1903) was a famous comedic stage actor.

Early life
He was born Henry Robson Stuart in Annapolis, Maryland, United States. His parents were Charles Stuart and the former Alicia Ann Thompson.

Career
He appeared in many theatrical productions from the 1860s to the early 1900s in New York City, Boston, and London. He was best known for his long collaboration with William H. Crane, which lasted over ten years. They appeared together in Our Bachelors, Sharps and Flats, The Henrietta, The Merry Wives of Windsor, and She Stoops to Conquer. They were perhaps most popular as the two Dromios in The Comedy of Errors.

Robson was an eccentric comedian who had a curious voice that was often described as the "Robson Squeek".  His first marriage was to Margaret Eleanor Johnson in about 1858. They had a daughter, Alicia Virginia Robson. Margaret died in 1890. Robson married Mary Dougherty, an actress who went by the stage name of May Waldron, in 1891. They had a son, Stuart Robson, Jr., who also acted briefly on the stage in New York and subsequently ran a magic shop there for many years.

Later years

Stuart Robson lived for many years in Cohasset, Massachusetts. He died in New York City in 1903, and was buried in Cohasset. His wife continued to appear on the stage under the name May Robson until her death in 1924. She should not be confused with the actress of the same name, May Robson, who appeared in many films in the 1930s.

References

External links

Stuart Robson (1836-1903)

1836 births
1903 deaths
19th-century American male actors
American male stage actors